The Dallas Marshals were a member of Champions Indoor Football and based in Dallas, Texas. The Marshals were scheduled to play their home games at the Fair Park Coliseum, but all remaining Marshals games were listed as postponed as of April 21, 2018. The team announced it had ceased operations on April 27.

History
The Mesquite Marshals were announced on June 30, 2015, to play out of Mesquite Arena as part of Champions Indoor Football (CIF). They announced their head coach and released their uniforms the following day. Doug Bland, one of the future owners, attended a Texas Revolution game in nearby Allen the previous season and helped found the Marshals. The Marshals finished their inaugural season with a record of 2–10, finishing in sixth place in the CIF Southern Division. After the team's first season, they were renamed to the Dallas Marshals. 

In 2017, after their second season, part owner Doug Bland also left the organization to found another team in the CIF, the Quad City Steamwheelers, selling the entire team to Bruce Badgett. Bland also sold Mesquite Arena to another party.

Prior to their third season, on December 21, 2017, the team announced their move to Dallas and the Fair Park Coliseum due to arena lease issues in negotiations with the new arena owners. Before the 2018 season, the Marshals canceled their first home exhibition game for February 17. The played their next two regular season home games on March 3 and 10, however, they canceled their next two for March 24 and April 14 on the day of the games. After the April 14 postponed game, the CIF issued a statement that a decision concerning the team is pending. The Marshals played an away game at the Texas Revolution on April 21, and the Fair Park Coliseum listed all remaining Marshals' games as postponed. On April 27, the team suspended operations for the rest of the season.

Logos and uniform
The Mesquite Marshals unveiled their uniforms on July 1, 2015. The helmets are white with a green stripe running parallel to a gold stripe along with a white facemask. The logo of a Marshal with a star on a hat is depicted over the word "MESQUITE" on top of the word "MARSHALS" in Ewert font. Their home uniforms consist of green jerseys and stripe-free green pants, with red outlining the white numbers in Ewert, along with green and gold stripes along the shoulder pads. The team's road uniforms have white jerseys and blank white pants. Green numbers (Ewert) with a thin layer of gold surrounding them can be seen on the road jerseys.

Roster

Statistics and records

Season-by-season results

Game results
2016

2017

References

External links
 Official Site

Champions Indoor Football teams
Defunct American football teams in Texas
Sports teams in the Dallas–Fort Worth metroplex
American football teams established in 2017
American football teams disestablished in 2018
2017 establishments in Texas
2018 disestablishments in Texas